Sabulilitoribacter is a bacteria genus from the family of Flavobacteriaceae.

References

Flavobacteria
Bacteria genera